R3 Motorsports (formerly Richardson Motorsports) was an American professional stock car racing team that last competed in the NASCAR Sprint Cup Series, Nationwide Series, Camping World Truck Series and ARCA Re/Max Series. The team commonly fielded No. 23 North Texas Pipe Chevrolet Impala driven by Robert Richardson, Jr. part-time in the Nationwide Series. The team shut down in 2015, and sold their equipment to Rick Ware Racing.

History
R3 Motorsports began running the ARCA RE/MAX Series in 2005 as Richardson Racing. It fielded the No. 33 in the first two races of the season with Richardson Jr., with a fourteenth-place finish at Nashville Superspeedway.  The team changed its name to R3 Motorsports and started their entry into NASCAR's top series.

Camping World Truck Series

Truck No. 1 history
In 2005, R3 ran one race in the Craftsman Truck Series at Phoenix with Richardson, Jr. finishing thirty-fourth in the No. 35 Chevrolet Silverado after wrecking.

At the end of the season, the team bought the equipment and owners points from Ultra Motorsports and changed to the No. 1 running full-time in 2006. With WinYourMortage.com sponsoring, the team qualified for twenty races and had two top-twenty finishes, but shut down their Truck team at the end of the season due to lack of sponsorship. They did attempt three Busch Series races in the No. 80 McKinley Pipe/Kinky Friedman Chevy, but did not qualify for either race.

Nationwide Series

Car Nos. 03 and 50 history
In 2011, the team entered a second car, No. 03, at Las Vegas for Charles Lewandoski due to the short field of 42 cars.  Alex Kennedy drove the No. 03 at Fontana.  Scott Riggs drove at Michigan and Kentucky.  Scott Wimmer drove at Road America.  All races in 2011 have been start and parks to help fund the No. 23, the team's main car.

Also in 2011 a third R3 car the No. 50 car attempted one race at Watkins Glen. Driver Brian Simo got a DNQ.

Car No. 23 history
In 2008, R3 returned with Robert Richardson attempting 8 races and making 5. Renegade wheels served as the sponsor at Lowes and Mahindra Tractors at other races.  Richardson had a best finish of 23rd at Kansas.

In 2009, the team ran a full schedule with Aaron's and Mahindra serving as the primary sponsors.  Robert Richardson Jr and Ken Butler III served as the primary drivers for the season. For the race at the Circuit Gilles Villeneuve, Canadian driver Jean-Francois Dumoulin drove the car and finished in 7th (R3 Motorsports' best finish of the year). Jeff Fuller drove at Darlington Raceway and finished thirtieth.

For the 2010 season, R3 Motorsports fielded five drivers in the NASCAR Nationwide series No. 23. Robert Richardson III ran most of the tracks throughout the season.  R3 hired Alex Kennedy for Road America and Watkins Glen. R3 Motorsports also hired Coleman Pressley (the son of former NASCAR Sprint cup series driver Robert Pressley) to drive at Bristol Motor Speedway and Nashville, the team finished 12th at Nashville.  The team also ran with Marc Davis, Johnny Sauter, and Payton Sellers each running one race.

For 2011, the No. 23 team returned and switched from Chevrolet to Dodge and was sponsored by Wildlife Conservation Society (WCS). Richardson has run the majority of the races.  Richardson's best finish so far is 22nd at Las Vegas and Iowa.  Alex Kennedy drove the No. 23 at Dover and America finishing 32nd and 21st respectively.  Scott Riggs ran the No. 23 at Darlington finishing 13th, R3's best finish in 2011. The team made the switched back Chevrolet at Kentucky Motorspeedway and will remain in the Chevy Camp fielding Impala's.

They fielded the No. 23 full-time again in 2012 with Robert Richardson Jr. and Jamie Dick sharing the ride. Anthony Gandon ran the No. 23 at Mid-Ohio.

In 2015, R3 Motorsports shut down the team, with the shop being leased.

Car No. 80 history
In 2006, R3 attempted three Nationwide series races in the No. 80 Chevy with Richardson driving.  The team did not qualify for any of their events.

R3 attempted only one race in 2007.  Richardson attempted to qualify the No. 80 at Texas, but once again failed to qualify.  After 2007, R3 shut down the No. 80 team.

Sprint Cup Series

Car No. 23 history
R3 attempted the 2009 Daytona 500 with Mike Skinner, but did not qualify for the event.

In 2010, R3 Motorsports attempted to run the October race at Charlotte with Johnny Sauter driving, but failed to qualify. They also attempted the November Texas race with Josh Wise, but again did not qualify.

After not attempting a race for a year, they attempted the 2011 fall race at Phoenix with Scott Riggs but did not qualify.

For 2012, the team will attempt the full Sprint Cup Series schedule using cars purchased from Earnhardt Ganassi Racing, using the number 23. Robert Richardson Jr. ran two Daytona races and two Talladega races in Toyotas. Scott Riggs will run through the rest of the season, running Chevys. Riggs got the team qualified for the first time in Phoenix. The Cup team is a start-and-park operation to help fund the Nationwide Series team.

Statistics

Nationwide Series

Truck Series

References

Defunct NASCAR teams
ARCA Menards Series teams
Auto racing teams established in 2005
Auto racing teams disestablished in 2015